Amphiuridae (commonly called long-armed burrowing brittle stars or burrowing brittle stars) are a large family of brittle stars of the suborder Gnathophiurina. Some species are used to study echinoderm development (e.g. Amphipholis kochii and Amphioplus abditus) and bioluminescence (the dwarf brittle star, Amphipholis squamata).

Characteristics
Amphiuridae are generally small brittlestars. Their jaws are always with two apical papillae at the tip, and one or more papillae on each side.

Systematics and phylogeny
Amphiuridae are the most diverse family of Ophiurida with over 200 species. The family contains the following genera:

In addition, two extinct genera are known:
 † Deckersamphiura Jagt, 2000
 † Xanthamphiura Hess 1970

Ecology
Amphiuridae are found in oceans worldwide from tropics to Arctic and Antarctic regions, with some species living in brackish water. They live mostly by burrowing in the seafloor or hiding under rocks. Most of them are herbivores feeding directly on algae, or detritus feeders, using their long arms to direct organic materials towards their mouths.

Though most amphiurid brittlestars broadcast their eggs and sperm into the sea, many species in this family are "brooders" and carry their young in bursae. One species, Amphiodia akosmos from the Monterey Peninsula of California, was found with up to 11 brooding embryos in one adult (Hendler and Bundrick, 2001).

References

 
Gnathophiurina
Echinoderm families
Extant Jurassic first appearances